Chiang Chi-li (born 28 January 1971) is a Taiwanese swimmer. He competed in three events at the 1988 Summer Olympics.

References

External links
 

1971 births
Living people
Taiwanese male swimmers
Olympic swimmers of Taiwan
Swimmers at the 1988 Summer Olympics
Place of birth missing (living people)